VGF or VGF nerve growth factor inducible is a secreted protein and neuropeptide precursor that may play a role in regulating energy homeostasis, metabolism and synaptic plasticity. The protein was first discovered in 1985 by Levi et al. in an experiment with PC12 cells and its name is non-acronymic. VGF gene encodes a precursor which is divided by proteolysis to polypeptides of different mass, which have a variety of functions, the best studied of which are the roles of TLQP-21 in the control of appetite and inflammation, and TLQP-62 as well as AQEE-30 in regulating depression-like behaviors and memory. The expression of VGF and VGF-derived peptides is detected in a subset of neurons in the central and peripheral nervous systems and specific populations of endocrine cells in the adenohypophysis, adrenal medulla, gastrointestinal tract, and pancreas. VGF expression is induced by NGF, CREB and BDNF and regulated by neurotrophin-3. Physical exercise significantly increases VGF expression in mice hippocampal tissue and upregulates a neurotrophic signaling cascade thought to underlie the action of antidepressants.

Role in pathology 
Changes in expression of discrete VGF fragments have been detected in different neurological and psychiatric conditions. In schizophrenia, one study has shown an increase in the VGF23-62 peptide and a subsequent small study demonstrated that drugs further increase the expression, pointing at a possible ameliorating action of the fragment. A decreased expression of VGF26-62 peptide was found in frontotemporal dementia and the expression of a fragment containing aminoacids 378-398 was found to be changing in amyotrophic lateral sclerosis and Alzheimer's disease. VGF expression has also been shown in damaged peripheral nerves, and it is thought to have a role in neuropathic pain. In glioblastoma, VGF has been shown to play autocrine and paracrine roles in feedback loops between differentiated glioblastoma cells and glioblastoma-specific cancer stem cells, promoting growth, survival and self-renewal.

References 

Proteins
Neuropeptides